Onchidium stuxbergi is a species of air-breathing sea slug, a shell-less brackish water pulmonate gastropod mollusk in the family Onchidiidae.

Distribution
From north-eastern India (West Bengal) to the Philippines, including Peninsular Malaysia, Singapore, Thailand, Vietnam, eastern Borneo, and China.

Description
Slug has long eye tentacles and fully retractable, central papilla with three dorsal eyes. The foot is bright orange.

References

Onchidiidae
Gastropods described in 1883